Willard McKenzie Burleson III (born October 9, 1965) is a United States Army lieutenant general who serves as the Commanding General of the Eighth United States Army and the Chief of Staff of the ROK/US Combined Forces Command.

Previously, Burleson served as the Director of Operations of the United Nations Command, ROK/US Combined Forces Command, and United States Forces Korea.

Education
Burleson holds a Bachelor of Science degree from the United States Military Academy. He also earned a Master's degree in Strategic Studies from the United States Army War College and a Master's degree in Military Art and Science from the Army Command and General Staff College.

Military career
Burleson graduated from the United States Military Academy and was commissioned into the Infantry in May 1988. Burleson's first assignment was in the 7th Infantry Division (Light), Fort Ord, California, which included service in the Multi-National Force and Observers, Sinai Peninsula, Egypt, and the invasion of Panama. He also served in 1st Battalion, 75th Ranger Regiment, Savannah, Georgia. He later commanded airborne companies in Vicenza, Italy, which included service as part of the initial entry force for operations in Bosnia-Herzegovina.

After competing duties in Italy, Burleson returned to the 75th Ranger Regiment at Fort Benning, Georgia, and then served as aide-de-camp to the commander of United States Army Training and Doctrine Command. Burleson later served in the 82nd Airborne Division at Fort Bragg, North Carolina, with deployments to Kosovo and Afghanistan.

Burleson next served as aide-de-camp to the commander of the XVIII Airborne Corps, with duty in the Combined Joint Task Force 180 and Multi-National Corps Iraq. Following that tour of duty, Burleson commanded the 1st Battalion, 87th Infantry, 10th Mountain Division at Fort Drum, New York, which included a tour with Multi-National Division, Baghdad, Iraq.

After attending the United States Army War College, Burleson returned to the 10th Mountain Division as commander of the 1st Brigade, which included a deployment to Regional Command-North, Afghanistan. Upon completion of brigade command, he served as the commander of the Joint Readiness Training Center’s Operations Group at Fort Polk, Louisiana.

Burleson later served as the Deputy Commanding General (Operations), 7th Infantry Division (United States), Joint Base Lewis-McChord, Washington, and Director of the Mission Command Center of Excellence at Fort Leavenworth, Kansas, and as senior advisor to the Ministry of Defense, Afghanistan. Before serving in the Republic of Korea, Burleson served as the commanding general of 7th Infantry Division at Joint Base Lewis-McChord, Washington.

Awards and decorations

Personal life
Burleson and his wife both come from army families and they have a son and a daughter.

References

Living people
1965 births
Military personnel from Philadelphia
Recipients of the Defense Superior Service Medal
Recipients of the Distinguished Service Medal (US Army)
Recipients of the Legion of Merit
United States Army generals
United States Army personnel of the Gulf War
United States Army personnel of the Iraq War
United States Army personnel of the War in Afghanistan (2001–2021)